United Nations Security Council resolution 951, adopted without a vote on 21 October 1994, after noting the death of International Court of Justice (ICJ) judge Nikolai Konstantinovitch Tarassov on 28 September 1994, the Council decided that elections to the vacancy on the ICJ would take place on 26 January 1995 at the Security Council and at a meeting of the General Assembly during its 49th session.

Tarassov, a Russian diplomat, was a member of the court since 1985. His term of office was due to expire in February 1997.

See also
 Judges of the International Court of Justice
 List of United Nations Security Council Resolutions 901 to 1000 (1994–1995)

References

External links
 
Text of the Resolution at undocs.org

 0951
 0951
October 1994 events